This article lists extreme locations on Earth that hold geographical records or are otherwise known for their geophysical or meteorological superlatives. All of these locations are Earth-wide extremes; extremes of individual continents or countries are not listed.

Latitude and longitude

Northernmost
 The northernmost point on Earth is the Geographic North Pole, in the Arctic Ocean.
 The northernmost point of land is the northern tip of Kaffeklubben Island, north of Greenland, which lies slightly north of Cape Morris Jesup, Greenland. Various shifting gravel bars lie farther north, the most famous being Oodaaq. There have been other islands more northern such as 83-42 and ATOW1996 but they have not been confirmed as permanent.

Southernmost
 The southernmost point on Earth and the southernmost point on land is the Geographic South Pole, which is on the continent of Antarctica.
 The southernmost continental point of land outside Antarctica is in South America at Cape Froward, Magallanes Region, Chile.
 The southernmost point of ocean is located on the Gould Coast.
 The southernmost point of open ocean is in the Bay of Whales, also part of the Ross Sea, at 78°30'S, at the edge of the Ross Ice Shelf.
 The southernmost island is considered to be Deverall Island, near the Shackleton Coast, surrounded by the Ross Ice Shelf although there is an island in Lake Vostok but it is currently under ice.

Easternmost and westernmost
 The easternmost and westernmost points on Earth, based on the east–west standard for describing longitude, can be found anywhere along the 180th meridian, which passes through the Arctic, Pacific, and Southern Oceans, as well as parts of Siberia (including Wrangel Island), Antarctica, and three islands of Fiji (Vanua Levu's eastern peninsula, the middle of Taveuni, and the western part of Rabi Island).
 Using instead the path of the International Date Line (which is not a straight line), the westernmost point on land is Attu Island, Alaska, and the easternmost point on land is Caroline Island, Kiribati.

Longest grid lines

Along constant latitude
 The longest continuous east–west distance on land is  along the latitude 48°24'53"N, from the west coast of France (Pointe de Corsen) through Central Europe, Ukraine, Russia, Kazakhstan, Mongolia and China, to a point on the east coast of Russia.
 The longest continuous east–west distance at sea is  along the latitude 55°59'S, south of Cape Horn, South America.
 The longest continuous east–west distance at sea between two continents is  along the latitude 18°39'12"N, from the coast of Hainan, China across the Pacific Ocean to the coast of Michoacán, Mexico.

Along constant longitude
 The longest continuous north–south distance on land is  along the meridian 99°1'30"E, from the northern tip of Siberia in the Russian Federation, through Mongolia, China, and Myanmar, to a point on the south coast of Thailand.
 The longest in Africa is  along the meridian 20°12'E, from the north coast of Libya, through Chad, Central African Republic, Democratic Republic of the Congo, Angola, Namibia, and Botswana, to the south coast of South Africa.
 The longest in South America is the length  along the meridian 70°2'W, from the north coast of Venezuela, through Colombia, Ecuador, Peru, and Chile, to the southern tip of Argentina.
 The longest in North America is  along the meridian 97°52'30"W, from northern Canada, through the United States, to southern Mexico.
 The longest continuous north–south distance at sea is  along the meridian 34°45'45"W, from the coast of Eastern Greenland across the Atlantic Ocean to the Filchner-Ronne Ice Shelf, on the coast of Antarctica. The longest in the Pacific Ocean is  along the meridian 172°8'30"W, from the coast of Siberia to the Ross Ice Shelf in Antarctica.
 The meridian that crosses the greatest total distance on land (disregarding intervening bodies of water) is still to be determined. More than 65% of this meridian's length is located on land. The next six longest integer meridians by total distance over land are, in order:
 23°E:  through Europe, Africa, and Antarctica
 27°E:  through Europe, Asia, Africa, and Antarctica
 25°E:  through Europe, Africa, and Antarctica
 26°E:  through Europe, Africa, and Antarctica
 24°E:  through Europe, Africa, and Antarctica
 28°E:  through Europe, Asia, and Africa

Along any geodesic
These are the longest straight lines that can be drawn between any two points on the surface of the Earth and remain exclusively over land or water; the points need not lie on the same line of latitude or longitude.
This line passes through Morocco, Algeria, Mali, Niger, Nigeria, Cameroon, Equatorial Guinea, Gabon, Republic of the Congo, Democratic Republic of the Congo, Angola, Namibia, Botswana, and South Africa.
This line passes through India, Nepal, China, Mongolia, and Russia.
This line passes through Portugal, Spain, France, Germany, Poland, Lithuania, Belarus, and Russia.
This line passes through Alaska, Canada, the contiguous United States, and Mexico.
This line passes through Venezuela, Colombia, Brazil, Peru, Chile, and Argentina.
Some examples of such routes would be:
 From the south coast of Balochistan province somewhere near Port of Karachi, Pakistan across the Arabian Sea, southwest through the Indian Ocean, near Comoros, passing Namaete Canyon, near the South African coast, across the South Atlantic Ocean, then west across Cape Horn, then northwest across the Pacific Ocean, near Easter Island, passing the antipodal point near Amlia island, through the South Bering Sea and ending somewhere on the northeast coast of Kamchatka, near Ossora. This route was confirmed to be the longest (at about 32090 km) given map data at a 1.8 km level of resolution.
 From the south coast of Hormozgan province, Iran across the Gulf of Oman, southeast across the Arabian Sea, passing south of Australia and New Zealand, near the Antarctic coast, then northeast across the South Pacific Ocean, passing the antipodal point and ending on the southwest coast of Mexico somewhere near Ciudad Lázaro Cárdenas.
 From Invercargill, New Zealand across Cape Horn, then off the coast of Brazil close to Recife, passing north of Cape Verde, passing the antipodal point and ending somewhere on the southwest coast of Ireland.

Along any diameter (straight line passing through the centre of the Earth)
As distinct from geodesic lines, which appear straight only when projected onto the spheroidal surface of the Earth (i.e. arcs of great circles), straight lines passing through the Earth's centre can be constructed through the interior of the Earth between almost any two points on the surface of the Earth (some extreme topographical situations such as overhanging cliffs being the rare exceptions). A line projected from the summit of Cayambe in Ecuador (see highest points) through the axial centre of the Earth to its antipode on the island of Sumatra results in the longest diameter that can be produced anywhere through the Earth.

Elevation

Highest points

 The highest point on Earth's surface measured from sea level is the summit of Mount Everest, on the border of Nepal and China. The summit was first reached by Sir Edmund Hillary of New Zealand and Tenzing Norgay Sherpa of Nepal in 1953.
Because Earth is an oblate spheroid rather than a perfect sphere, it is wider at the equator and narrower toward each pole. Peru's Huascarán (at ) contends closely with Chimborazo, though the former is a mere  closer to the Earth's centre.
More important, however, Cayambe's proximity to the Equator means that the majority of its distance from the Earth's centre contributes to Cayambe's distance from the Earth's axis.

Highest geographical features
 The highest volcano is Ojos del Salado on the Argentina–Chile border. It has the highest summit, of any volcano on Earth.
Above these elevations, there are no constantly flowing rivers since the temperature is almost always below freezing.

Highest points attainable by transportation
 The highest point accessible...
It was once usable by 20-tonne mining trucks. The road is no longer usable. 
 ...by road (mountain pass) is disputed; there are a number of competing claims for this title due to the definition of "motorable pass" (i.e. a surfaced road or one simply passable by a vehicle):
It is used by trucks and buses regularly.
 The highest unsurfaced road has several different claimants. All are unsurfaced or gravel roads including Mana Pass, between India and Tibet, which is crossed by a gravel road reaching .
Before the Qingzang Railway was built, the highest railway ran between Lima and Huancayo in Peru, reaching  at Ticlio.
 ...by oceangoing vessel is a segment of the Rhine–Main–Danube Canal between the Hilpoltstein and Bachhausen locks in Bavaria, Germany.

 The highest permanent human settlement is La Rinconada, Peru, in the Peruvian Andes.

Lowest points

Lowest natural points

Jacques Piccard and U.S. Navy Lieutenant Don Walsh first reached Challenger Deep in 1960 aboard the bathyscaphe Trieste, followed by filmmaker James Cameron in 2012 aboard Deepsea Challenger. Between 2020 and 2022, DSV Limiting Factor made 19 dives to Challenger Deep, carrying with it 19 further visitors.

 The point on the surface closest to the Earth's centre (interpreted as a natural surface of the land or sea that is accessible by a person) is the surface of the Arctic Ocean at the Geographic North Pole.
Because Earth is an oblate spheroid rather than a perfect sphere, it is wider at the equator and narrower toward each pole. Molloy Deep, also in Arctic Ocean (at ) from Earth's centre contends closely with Litke Deep, the difference from Earth's centre being just .

 The slowest point on Earth or, in other words, the point nearest to Earth's rotational axis are the North and South Poles which are stationary around Earth's axis. They do not revolve around Earth's axis as they lie on axis itself.

Lowest artificial points
The lowest point underwater is the -deep (as measured from the subsea wellhead) oil and gas well drilled on the Tiber Oil Field in the Gulf of Mexico.

Lowest points attainable by transportation
 The lowest point accessible...
 Some mines have roads accessible from outside or rail tracks, located more than two thousand metres below sea level, for example in some South African gold mines.

Table of extreme elevations and air temperatures by continent

Humans and Biogeography

In contrast to places with the highest density of life, like terrestrial tropical regions, and beside local extreme conditions, which might only be overcome by extremophiles, there are areas of extreme low amounts of life.

Next to terrestrial lifeless areas like the Antarctic desert's McMurdo Dry Valleys and its Don Juan Pond, the most lifeless area in the ocean studied (other than the more general dead zones) is the South Pacific Gyre, corresponding to the oceanic pole of inaccessibility.

The oceanic pole of inaccessibility is also the antipodal area of the human center of population which lies today around southern Central Asia. Similarly the world's economic center of gravity has been drifting since antiquity from Central Asia to Northern Europe and contemporarily back to Central Asia. The related centre of gravity of the worlds carbon emission has shifted from Britain during the Industrial Revolution to the Atlantic, back again and contemporarily into Central Asia.

Remoteness

Poles of inaccessibility

Each continent has its own continental pole of inaccessibility, defined as the place on the continent that is farthest from any ocean. Similarly, each ocean has its own oceanic pole of inaccessibility, defined as the place in the ocean that is farthest from any land.

Continental
 The most distant point from an ocean is the Eurasian Pole of Inaccessibility (or "EPIA") , in China's Xinjiang region near the border with Kazakhstan. A 2007 study suggests that the historical calculation of the EPIA failed to recognize the point where the Gulf of Ob joins the Arctic Ocean, and proposes instead that varying definitions of coastline could result in other locations for the EPIA:
If adopted, this would place the final EPIA roughly  closer to the ocean than the point that is currently agreed upon. Coincidentally, EPIA1, or EPIA2, and the most remote of the Oceanic Pole of Inaccessibility (specifically, the point in the South Pacific Ocean that is farthest from land) are similarly remote; EPIA1 is less than  closer to the ocean than the Oceanic Pole of Inaccessibility is to land.
 The continental poles of inaccessibility for the other continents are as follows:
 Africa: , close to the tripoint of the Central African Republic, South Sudan, and the Democratic Republic of the Congo
 North America: , between Kyle, South Dakota and Allen, South Dakota, United States.
 South America: , near Arenápolis, Mato Grosso, Brazil

Oceanic

Other places considered the most remote

 The most remote island is Bouvet Island, a small, uninhabited island in the South Atlantic Ocean that is a dependency of Norway. It lies at coordinates .
 The title for most remote inhabited island or archipelago (the farthest away from any other permanently inhabited place) depends on how the question is interpreted.
 Remote Cities
 The most remote city with a population in excess of one million from the nearest city with a population in excess of one million is Auckland, New Zealand.
 The most remote city with a population in excess of 100,000 from the nearest city with a population in excess of 100,000 is Honolulu, Hawaii, United States.
 The most remote airport in the world from another airport is Mataveri International Airport (IPC) on Easter Island, which has a single runway for military and public use. In comparison, the airport at the Amundsen–Scott South Pole Station (NZSP) is not very remote at all, being located only  from Williams Field (NZWD) near Ross Island.

Farthest-apart cities
The pairs of cities (with a population over 100,000) with the greatest distance between them (antipodes) are:
 Xinghua, China to Rosario, Argentina: 
 Lu'an, China to Río Cuarto, Argentina: 
 Subang Jaya, Malaysia to Cuenca, Ecuador: 
 Shanghai, China to Concordia, Argentina: 
 Rancagua, Chile to Xi'an, China: 
 Rui'an, China to Resistencia, Argentina: 
 Yantai, China to Tandil, Argentina: 
 Lichuan, China to Coquimbo, Chile: 
 Bandung, Indonesia to Piedecuesta, Colombia: 
 Salamanca, Spain to Lower Hutt, New Zealand: 

The pair of airports with scheduled flights having the greatest distance between them has been measured to be Sultan Mahmud Badaruddin II International Airport, which serves Palembang, Indonesia, and Benito Salas Airport, which serves Neiva, Colombia, located about 10,819 nautical miles (20,037 km) apart.

Centre
Since the Earth is a spheroid, its centre (the core) is thousands of kilometres beneath its crust. Still, there have been attempts to define various "centrepoints" on the Earth's surface.
It lies at the intersection of the Equator and the Prime Meridian, is marked with a buoy and sometimes called Null Island. However, the selection of the Prime Meridian as the 0° longitude meridian depended on cultural and historical factors and is therefore geographically arbitrary (any of the Earth's meridians could, in principle, be defined as 0° longitude); consequently, the position of the "Null Island" centrepoint is also arbitrary.
 The centre of population, the place to which there is the shortest average route for every individual human being in the world, could also be considered a "centre of the world". This point is located in the north of the Indian subcontinent, although the precise location has never been calculated and is constantly shifting due to changes in the distribution of the human population across the planet.

Geophysical extremes

Tallest mountain

Greatest vertical drop

Subterranean

Greatest oceanic depths

Deepest ice
Ice sheets on land, but having the base below sea level. Places under ice are not considered to be on land.

Meteorological extremes

Coldest and hottest inhabited places on Earth

Ground temperatures
Temperatures measured directly on the ground may exceed air temperatures by 30 to 50 °C. A ground temperature of 84 °C (183.2 °F) has been recorded in Port Sudan, Sudan. A ground temperature of 93.9 °C (201 °F) was recorded in Furnace Creek, Death Valley, California, United States on 15 July 1972; this may be the highest natural ground surface temperature ever recorded. The theoretical maximum possible ground surface temperature has been estimated to be between 90 and 100 °C for dry, darkish soils of low thermal conductivity.

Satellite measurements of ground temperature taken between 2003 and 2009, taken with the MODIS infrared spectroradiometer on the Aqua satellite, found a maximum temperature of 70.7 °C (159.3 °F), which was recorded in 2005 in the Lut Desert, Iran. The Lut Desert was also found to have the highest maximum temperature in 5 of the 7 years measured (2004, 2005, 2006, 2007 and 2009). These measurements reflect averages over a large region and so are lower than the maximum point surface temperature.

Although this is not comparable to an air temperature, it is believed that the air temperature at this location would have been lower than the official record lowest air temperature of −89.2 °C.

Extreme points by region

Afro-Eurasia
Extreme points of Afro-Eurasia
Africa

 Eurasia
Asia

Europe

The Americas
Extreme points of the Americas
North America

Central America
 
The Caribbean
 
South America

Oceania
Extreme points of Oceania

Antarctica
Extreme points of Antarctica

Arctic
Extreme points of the Arctic

See also

 Geographical centre
 Lists of extreme points
 Latitude and longitude
 List of northernmost items (city, capital, island, etc.)
 List of southernmost items (city, capital, island, etc.)
 List of countries by northernmost point
 List of countries by southernmost point
 Northernmost settlements
 Southernmost settlements
 Elevation
 List of elevation extremes by country
 List of elevation extremes by region
 List of highest towns by country
 Extreme points of the Commonwealth of Nations
 Geophysical features
 List of deepest caves
 List of deepest oceanic trenches
 List of deserts by area
 List of highest mountains on Earth
 List of volcanoes by elevation
 List of impact craters on Earth
 List of islands by area
 List of lakes by area
 List of lakes by depth
 List of rivers by length
 List of waterfalls by height
 Meteorology and climate
 List of weather records
 Beyond Earth
 List of Solar System extremes
 List of extrasolar planet extremes

Notes

References

External links
United States National Climatic Data Center
AWOW Top List World Top 10 Hottest Places 

Mountains
 
Earth